The cimetière parisien de Thiais is one of three Parisian cemeteries extra muros, and is located in the commune of Thiais, in the Val-de-Marne department, in the Île-de-France region.

History
The cemetery was opened in October 1929 and is therefore the newest of the three Parisian cemeteries extra muros. The others being the cimetière parisien de Bagneux and the cimetière parisien de Pantin. It is now a true cosmopolitan cemetery, where many faiths are represented.

Size
Thiais is the second largest Parisian cemetery. Only Pantin is larger. There are about 6,000 trees. The cemetery is divided into 123 numbered divisions in which there are an estimated 150,000 graves. Because the cemetery is so large, people with a walking disability can be driven around.

Notable burials
 In divisions 48 through 55 there are Jardins de la Fraternité which are meant for burial of those in Paris who could not afford burial or who could not be identified. Because of this it has the reputation of being the "Cemetery of the poor and penniless".
 Ashes of the dead who donated their body to science are scattered in Division 102, where several stelae stand in their memory.
 Division 94 is reserved for stillbirths.
 There are military sections in divisions 1 and 17.

There are also a number of memorials:
 Monument for the French resistance (1942) (division 7)
 The Ermenonville crash in 1974 (division 16)
 The Paris-Brazzaville crash in 1961 (division 22)
 Monument for the Policier auxiliaires, persons who have chosen to do their national service in the French national police force (division 25)
 Monument for French Indochina solidarity (division 36)
 Monuments for Génie de la Terre (Chinese protective deities) (division 36 and 44)

Individual burials. Many of the graves have been cleared after the concession ran out.
 Jean-Marie Bastien-Thiry, French Air Force lieutenant-colonel, sentenced to death by court martial, he was the last French person to be executed by firing squad, later reburied in the cemetery of Bourg-la-Reine
 André Berley, French actor
 Francisco Boix-Campo, Spanish republican and survivor of Mauthausen
 Marcel Bucard, French fascist politician
 Jean Cassou, French writer, art critic, poet and member of the French Resistance during World War II
 Georges Catroux, French army general
 Paul Celan, Romanian poet and translator, with his wife Gisèle Lestrange
 Jean-Paul Le Chanois, French film director, screenwriter and actor
 André Deed, French-born actor and director
 Lise Delamare, French actress
 Jean-Luc Delarue, French television presenter and producer
 Kurt Gerstein, German SS-officer
 Étienne Hajdú, Transylvania-born French sculptor of Jewish descent and resistance fighter
 Jean Hérold-Paquis, French journalist who fought for Franco and the Nationalists during the Spanish Civil War
 Catherine Hessling, French actress
 Loumia Hiridjee, French businesswoman (Princesse Tam Tam)
 Lazare Kopelmanas, international jurist and diplomat
 Pierre Laval, French Prime Minister under the Third Republic and Vichy regime was initially buried there after his execution before being removed to the Chambrun family vault in Montparnasse Cemetery. 
 Gina Manès, Silent movie star
 Daniel Mayer, French politician (donated his body to science)
 Pascal Mazzotti, French actor, remains transferred to Biarritz
 Farhad Mehrad, Award winning Iranian rock singer, songwriter, guitarist, pianist. In Iran known as Farhad. Burial place of ashes.
 Gérald Neveu, French poet
 Antonieta Rivas Mercado, Mexican Writer transferred to Jardins de la Fraternité.
 Alice Prin, better known as  Kiki or The Queen of Montparnasse, grave was cleared in 1974
 Albert Raisner, French harmonica player, TV and radio host and producer
 Joseph Roth, Austrian-Jewish journalist and novelist
 Han Ryner, French individualist anarchist philosopher and activist and a novelist
 Lev Sedov, son of Léon Trotsky and his second wife Natalia Sedova, activist in the Trotskyist movement
 Madeleine Sologne, French actress
 Franz Stock, first German theology student in France since the Middle Ages, his remains were transferred to the church of Saint-Jean-Baptiste de Rechèvres in Chartres in June 1963
 Yevgeny Zamyatin, Russian author of science fiction and political satire
 Zog of Albania, Former president and king of Albania (his remains have since been repatriated to Albania).
 Mahmoud Shehabi Khorassani (1903 Iran – 1986 France) philosopher, jurist, supreme judge, author and distinguished professor at the University of Tehran, Iran buried in the 101st division, row 16.

Location
Located in the banlieue southwest of the city of Paris, France, the main entrance to the Cimetière de Thiais is located at 261 Route de Fontainebleau, in Thiais, near the junction with Avenue de la Republique. There is also a smaller entrance: Porte Est on Avenue de Général de Gaulle.

The inhabitants of Thiais are buried in the communal cemetery just off Avenue Général de Gaulle, near Espace des 4 Saisons.

Public transport
 
The cimetière de Thiais is a short walk from the Villejuif – Louis Aragon métro station, which can be reached by taking line 7. The nearest railway station is Pont de Rungis – Aéroport d'Orly which is served by line C, although it is not really nearby.

The cimetière de Thiais is also served by bus lines 185, 192, 285 and 396.

There is a Vélib' station at Avenue de Fontainebleau (42703).

Gallery

References

External links
 Cimetière Parisien de Thiais on the Mairie de Paris website (including plan)

1929 establishments in France
Cemeteries in Paris
Buildings and structures in Val-de-Marne
Tourist attractions in Val-de-Marne